Raycho Raychev (sometimes also transliterated as Raicho Raichev) (Bulgarian: Райчо Райчев) (born 1 February 1971) is a Bulgarian former footballer who played as a goalkeeper. In his career, he represented Minyor, CSKA Sofia, Metalurg Pernik, and Belasitsa.

References

1971 births
Living people
Bulgarian footballers
PFC CSKA Sofia players
PFC Minyor Pernik players
PFC Belasitsa Petrich players
First Professional Football League (Bulgaria) players
Association football goalkeepers